Edward William Glancy (January 13, 1917 – August 21, 1990) was an American professional basketball player. He played for the Oshkosh All-Stars in the National Basketball League for five games during the 1943–44 season and averaged 1.8 points per game. 

Glancy served in the Navy during World War II, and then served as the men's basketball and baseball coach (as well as the athletic director) for the Illinois Institute of Technology.

References

1917 births
1990 deaths
American men's basketball players
United States Navy personnel of World War II
Basketball coaches from Rhode Island
Basketball players from Rhode Island
Forwards (basketball)
Guards (basketball)
Illinois Tech Scarlet Hawks athletic directors
Illinois Tech Scarlet Hawks baseball coaches
Illinois Tech Scarlet Hawks men's basketball coaches
Manhattan Jaspers basketball players
Oshkosh All-Stars players
People from Cumberland, Rhode Island